The sixth series of Love Island began broadcasting on 12 January 2020 on ITV2. The series was announced on 24 July 2019 when it was confirmed that two series would air in 2020, and is also the first winter edition of the series. Unlike the summer edition, the luxury villa is located in Cape Town. This series is also the first to be hosted by Laura Whitmore, having taken over from Caroline Flack. The series is narrated by Iain Stirling.

On 15 February 2020, following the death of former presenter Caroline Flack, the Unseen Bits episode due to air that day was not broadcast; but was made available on the ITV Hub. The regular episode did not air the following day either. The show returned on 17 February with a tribute to Flack. On the same day, ITV2 confirmed that the companion series Love Island: Aftersun which was set to air after that episode's main show would not be broadcast. A further tribute to Flack aired during the final on 23 February, which featured a compilation of her time throughout her five series as host.

On 23 February 2020, the series was won by Finn Tapp and Paige Turley, having received 44.52% of the final vote. Siânnise Fudge and Luke Trotman finished as runners-up with 43.61% of the vote, making it the closest voting percentage between the final two couples ever with less than 1% between them.

Production
The first 10-second trailer for the series aired on 2 December 2019 featuring the tagline "Do one, winter". It was then followed by a full-length trailer that used the song Lose Control by Meduza, Becky Hill & Goodboys was released on 6 December 2019 which featured Caroline Flack. On 17 December 2019, Flack announced that she would be standing down as host following allegations of assault towards her boyfriend. On 20 December, it was announced that fellow TV presenter Laura Whitmore would be her replacement. She also took the role of presenting Love Island: Aftersun, which for the first time aired every Monday after the main show rather than its usual Sunday slot.

Villa
For the first winter edition of the show, the Islanders will stay at the Midden Cottage, located in the "ultra-wealthy" Constantia suburb of Cape Town.

Islanders
The Islanders for the sixth series were released on 6 January 2020, just six days before the launch. These include Eve and Jess Gale, who are the second set of twins to compete in the show following John and Tony Alberti in 2015. The series was won by Finn Tapp and Paige Turley.

Coupling
The couples were chosen shortly after the islanders enter the villa.

Notes

 : Eve and Jess arrived after the coupling on Day 1, but were told they would be able to steal boys for themselves on Day 2. Jess picked Mike, and Eve picked Callum.
 : Original Islanders were only given the option to remain in their current couple, or re-couple with one of the new Islanders.

Weekly summary
The main events in the Love Island villa are summarised in the table below.

Ratings
Official ratings are taken from BARB and include ITV2 +1. Catch-up service totals are added to the official ratings. Because the Saturday episodes are weekly catch-up episodes rather than nightly highlights, these are not included in the overall averages. The week 6 Sunday episode did not air due to the passing of former host Caroline Flack.

Controversies

Ollie Williams
Viewers called for contestant Ollie Williams to be axed after pictures were obtained by The Sun showing him posing next to animal corpses from endangered species in South Africa. A representative of Williams claimed he is a "conservationist and worked with an anti-poaching unit in Mozambique" involved in the culling of sick animals. However, according to Metro Williams is the director of a hunting business known as Cornish Sporting Agency. In since-deleted images on his social media, Williams is seen posing with dead animals alongside his clients. It led to a Change.org petition to remove Williams from the series.

Regulator Ofcom received 272 complaints after the first airing, 231 of which regarding Williams inclusion on the show. The producers stated they had no intention of removing Williams, saying they "refuse to back down to the public" and that they believed it would "blow over".

References

2020 British television seasons
Love Island (2015 TV series)